The Kick Inside is the debut studio album by English art rock singer Kate Bush. Released on 17 February 1978 by EMI Records, it includes her UK No. 1 hit, "Wuthering Heights". The album peaked at No. 3 on the UK Albums Chart and has been certified Platinum by the British Phonographic Industry (BPI). The production included efforts by several progressive rock veterans, including Duncan Mackay, Ian Bairnson, David Paton, Andrew Powell, and Stuart Elliott of the Alan Parsons Project, and David Gilmour of Pink Floyd.

Background and recording
Having written songs since the age of 11, Kate Bush recorded demos with the assistance of her brothers, who were also musicians. A friend of theirs, Ricky Hopper, brought some of these tapes to various record companies in 1972, when Bush was 13. The tapes were passed over, but Hopper played them for his friend David Gilmour of Pink Floyd. Gilmour was immediately intrigued and went to meet with the Bush family and was impressed with Kate's talent for songwriting. He financed some better quality demos and while Pink Floyd were recording their album Wish You Were Here (1975) at Abbey Road Studios, Gilmour played the tapes for record company executives. EMI Records was impressed and agreed to sign her, offering her an advance of £3,000. Two of the demos recorded in June 1975 were included on her debut album three years later: "The Man with the Child in His Eyes" and "The Saxophone Song".

In 1976, Bush's contract was finally agreed upon by her family. In preparation for the recording, she embarked on playing with the KT Bush Band around various pubs. According to her brother Paddy, who also played with her on stage, these started out as very small affairs with little interest but grew to larger audiences over the months. Finally, in July and August 1977, the rest of the songs were recorded at AIR Studios in London, helmed by producer Andrew Powell. Bush was keen to keep the line-up of the KT Bush Band for the recordings, but EMI insisted that she use properly experienced session musicians. Powell engaged Ian Bairnson, Duncan Mackay and Stuart Elliott among others, many of whom he had worked with before.

It was also around this time that Bush had started to study dance and movement as a way of presenting the songs and subsequently credited her dance teacher Lindsay Kemp on the album. The song "Moving" was inspired by Kemp. EMI and Bush disagreed over the use of a certain shot, which emphasised her cleavage, on the picture sleeve for the first single. Initially, this was to be "James and the Cold Gun", but Bush insisted on "Wuthering Heights". EMI relented and the single was scheduled for release in November 1977. However, due to the disagreement over the picture sleeve, this date was pushed back to the new year of 1978. The song became a big hit and reached number one in the UK Singles Chart in March. It stayed at the top of the charts for four weeks, becoming one of the biggest selling songs of the year and was the first time a female singer-songwriter topped the charts with a self-penned song.

The album, titled The Kick Inside, was released in February 1978 and featured 13 tracks. Bush's cinematic and literary influences, two qualities which would later be considered key to her work, were most obvious in the song "Wuthering Heights". The song was not initially inspired by Emily Brontë's novel but by a television adaptation, although Bush read the novel later in order to (in her own words) "get the research right". Further influences can be found when she references Gurdjieff in "Them Heavy People", while the title song is inspired by the ballad of Lizie Wan. Bush also writes openly about sexuality, particularly on the erotic "Feel It" and "L'Amour Looks Something Like You". "Strange Phenomena" questions unusual coincidences, premonition, and déjà vu.

The album's second single, "The Man with the Child in His Eyes", reached number six in the UK. Three other singles were released over the world during the next two years: "Them Heavy People", "Moving" (which reached number one in Japan) and "Strange Phenomena". "The Man with the Child in His Eyes" also charted on the American Billboard Hot 100, Bush's only single to do so until 1985. It peaked at number 85. Bush made an appearance on Saturday Night Live in December 1978. Despite this publicity, The Kick Inside failed to enter the Top 200 of the Billboard albums chart.

The album peaked at number three on the UK Albums Chart and remained on the chart for much of the rest of the year. Eventually clocking up 71 weeks in the chart, it was certified platinum and remains one of Bush's biggest selling records.

Release
The Kick Inside was released on 17 February 1978.

Six different varieties of the album's cover are known: the regular UK cover, a variant UK cover, the US cover, the Canadian cover, the Yugoslavian cover, the Japanese cover, and the Uruguayan cover; the Uruguayan cover being the rarest and most expensive due to its unusual head-on photo of Bush.

In the UK, it was released (twice) as a limited edition picture disc. This is housed in a full colour outer sleeve ('Kite' picture by Jay Myrdal). It sports a sticker declaring that it's a picture disc (category number EMCP 3223). Two versions were actually released: The first edition has a circular sticker stating that it is a picture disc (usually in the top left hand corner). The second pressing (apparently aimed at the US market, where the first pressing had proven popular) has an oval sticker (usually top centre). The second disc also states "manufactured in the UK by EMI Records Ltd." as part of the copyright notice printed on the disc. The first edition does not have this wording.

Critical reception

Contemporary reviews were full of praise for the album. Billboard favoured the songs "Wuthering Heights" and "Them Heavy People" among others and said Bush wrote "evocative lyrics" and delivered them with "smooth and unrestrained vocals". Kris DiLorenzo of Crawdaddy said that "Bush's talent for soul-baring would be frightening were it not so ingenuous; she writes from a well of fantasy and feeling with a patina of experience, her concerns universal and womanly, not the usual wilted kitten yearning or last-rave bathos." Peter Reilly of Stereo Review praised Bush for going against the grain in women's music. He favoured the songs "The Man with the Child in His Eyes" and "Room for the Life" but cared less for "Wuthering Heights" and "James and the Cold Gun".

In later reviews, the album continued to receive universal praise. Pitchfork critic Laura Snapes said of the album, "It is ornate music made in austere times, but unlike the pop sybarites to follow in the next decade, flaunting their wealth while Britain crumbled, Bush spun hers not from material trappings but the infinitely renewable resources of intellect and instinct: Her joyous debut measures the fullness of a woman's life by what's in her head." Snapes spoke highly of every track, but had slight lyrical reservations for "Room for the Life". In a 2008 review for BBC Music, writer Chris Jones said, "Using mainly session musicians, The Kick Inside was the result of a record company actually allowing a young talent to blossom. Some of these songs were written when she was 13! Helmed by Gilmour's friend, Andrew Powell, it's a lush blend of piano grandiosity, vaguely uncomfortable reggae and intricate, intelligent, wonderful songs. All delivered in a voice that had no precedents." He says that the record company wanting to push "James and the Cold Gun" as the first single was a mistake as he labels it the album's "dullest track". AllMusic's Bruce Eder said that the album is "the sound of an impressionable and highly precocious teenager spreading her wings for the first time" and called it "a mightily impressive debut".

Not all reviews were positive. Sandy Robertson, from the now defunct music magazine Sounds, criticized the lyrics, especially on the song "Kite": "WHAT IS this supposed to be? Doom-laden, 'meaningful' songs (with some of the worst lyrics ever; sample: 'Beelzebub is aching in my belly-o/My feet are heavy and I'm rooted in my wellios') sung with the most irritatingly yelping voice since Robert Plant".

In an article for Stylus Magazine, Marcello Carlin wrote that The Kick Inside "probably kicked down more doors than the whole of the first and second waves of punk combined", writing of Bush's unusual subjects, stark voice ("seeming to glide and swoop at will, covering three-and-a-half octaves with minimal apparent effort") and piano chord progressions, saying "their delayed sustain, their unexpected trapdoor modulations, the very fingers which were playing them ... couldn’t be ascribed to any realistic precedent; for one very important thing, they sounded so unambiguously feminine."

Track listing

Personnel
Credits are adapted from The Kick Inside liner notes.

Musicians
Kate Bush – lead and backing vocals; piano
Andrew Powell – arrangements; keyboards (2); piano; Fender Rhodes piano (3); bass guitar; celeste (6); synthesizer (9); beer bottles (12)
Duncan Mackay – piano; Fender Rhodes (1, 10); synthesizer (3); Hammond organ (4, 6, 7); clavinet (4)
Ian Bairnson – electric guitar; acoustic guitar (except on 2); backing vocals (9); beer bottles (12)
David Paton – bass guitar (1, 3, 4, 7, 9–12); acoustic guitar (6, 9); backing vocals (9)
Stuart Elliott – drums (exc. 2, 5, 13); percussion (9, 12)
Alan Skidmore – tenor saxophone (2)
Paul Keogh – electric guitar; acoustic guitar (2)
Alan Parker – acoustic guitar (2)
Bruce Lynch – bass guitar (2)
Barry de Souza – drums (2)
Morris Pert – percussion (3, 4, 6); boobam (12)
Paddy Bush – mandolin (9); backing vocals (11)
David Katz – orchestral contractor (for an unnamed orchestra on all tracks exc. 4, 5, 7, 8, 12)

Production
Andrew Powell – producer
David Gilmour – executive producer (2, 5)
Jon Kelly – recording engineer
Jon Walls – assistant engineer
Wally Traugott – mastering

Charts

Weekly charts

Year-end charts

Certifications and sales

See also
Kate Bush discography
List of awards and nominations received by Kate Bush

References

External links
 Engineer Jon Kelly discusses how the album was recorded
 

Kate Bush albums
1978 debut albums
Albums produced by Andrew Powell
EMI Records albums
Harvest Records albums
Art rock albums by English artists
Art pop albums
Baroque pop albums
Albums recorded at AIR Studios